Jelly may refer to:


Food
 Jelly (fruit preserves), a clear or translucent fruit spread or preserve
 Jelly (dessert), a clear or translucent dessert

Entertainment
 The Jellys, an English punk/pop band
 "Jelly" (song), a 2006 song by Japanese electronic duo Capsule
 Mr. Jelly, title character of the 1976 book Mr. Jelly, in the Mr. Men children's book series
 Nickname of Sergeant Jelal, a character in the 1959 novel Starship Troopers by Robert A. Heinlein
 Shadowmoor, a Magic: the Gathering expansion set, codenamed "Jelly" in development
 The Jellies!, an American adult animated television series

Other uses
 Jelly (name), a list of people with the nickname or surname
 Gelignite, also known as blasting jelly or simply jelly
 Temazepam, a powerful hypnotic drug, street name "jellies"
 Jellyfish, also known as jellies
 Apache Jelly, a Java- and XML-based scripting and processing engine for turning XML into executable code
 Petroleum jelly  
 Jelly (app), an app, and the company behind it

See also
 Jelli, a California-based advertising technology firm